Jasone Cenoz is a professor of education at the University of the Basque Country (UPV/EHU) University of the Basque Country in Donostia-San Sebastian, Spain since 2004. From 2000 to 2004 she was Professor of Applied Linguistics at the University of the Basque Country in Vitoria-Gasteiz.  Her research focuses on multilingual education, bilingualism and multilingualism. She is known for her work on the influence of bilingualism on third language acquisition, pedagogical translanguaging, linguistic landscape, minority languages and Content and Language Integrated Learning.

Career 
Jasone Cenoz received her Ph.D. from the University of the Basque Country in 1992. The title of her dissertation was "Teaching and learning English as a second or third language" (Enseñanza-aprendizaje del ingles como segunda o tercera lengua)

She co-founded the International Journal of Multilingualism and was co-editor of this journal from 2004 to 2012. She has been President of the International Association of Multilingualism 2014-2016  and Distinguished Visiting Professor in Graduate Center CUNY New York (2019).  She has also been a visiting researcher at different European, North American and Asian universities.

She is a member of the American Association for Applied Linguistics book award committee. She is member of the Governing Board of Ikerbasque-the Basque Foundation for Science and the Foundation ISEAK. Cenoz has supervised numerous PhD students.

Research 
Cenoz has worked on different areas of multilingualism in school contexts. She is noted in the field of third language acquisition for her work on Basque-Spanish influence on English as a third language. She currently works on pedagogical translanguaging which is "understood as the use of planned instruction strategies from the learners' repertoire to develop language awareness and metalinguistic awareness" (Cenoz & Gorter, 2020). She also works on linguistic landscape and minority languages

Publications: Books 
 Cenoz, J., & Gorter, D. (2021) Pedagogical Translanguaging. Cambridge: Cambridge University Press. OPEN ACCESS
 Cenoz, J., & Gorter, D. (Eds.) (2015). Multilingual education: between language learning and translanguaging. Cambridge: Cambridge University Press
 Gorter, D.; Zenotz, V. & Cenoz, J. (eds) (2014) Minority Languages and Multilingual Education. Berlin:
 Todeva, E. & Cenoz, J. (eds) (2009)The Multiple Realities of Multilingualism. Berlin: Mouton de Gruyter
 Cenoz, J. (2009) Towards Multilingual Education: Basque Educational Research from an International Perspective. Bristol: Multilingual Matters.
 Cenoz, J.; Hufeisen, B. & Jessner, U. (eds) (2003) The Multilingual Lexicon. Dordrecht: Kluwer Academic.
 Cenoz, J.; Hufeisen, B. &  Jessner, U. (eds) (2001) Cross-linguistic Influence in Third Language Acquisition Psycholinguistic Perspectives. Clevedon: Multilingual
 Cenoz, J. & Jessner, U. (eds) (2000) English in Europe: the Acquisition of a Third Language. Clevedon: Multilingual.
 Cenoz, J. & Genesee, F. (eds) (1998) Beyond Bilingualism: Multilingualism and Multilingual Education. Clevedon: Multilingual
 Cenoz has published articles in journals such as Applied Linguistics,  The Modern Language Journal, Language Teaching, Language, Culture and Curriculum, International Journal of Bilingual Education, Journal of Multilingual and Multicultural System,  International Journal of Multilingualism; World Englishes.

Awards 
 2011 Spanish Association of Applied Linguistics (AESLA) book prize her book Towards Multilingual Education: Basque Educational Research from an International Perspective. Bristol: Multilingual Matters.
 2020 Research award from the University of the Basque Country for her research

References

External links 
 Video: Focus on multilingualism and translanguaging in education
 Jasone Cenoz DREAM group University of the Basque Country
An interview with Dr. Jasone Cenoz about multilingual education and translanguaging
Jasone Cenoz, Encyclopedia or Applied Linguistics

Year of birth missing (living people)
Living people